Nina Linde (born 10 June 1980) is a German ice hockey player and former member of the German national ice hockey team. She represented Germany in the women's ice hockey tournament at the 2002 Winter Olympics and at the IIHF Women's World Championship in 1999, 2000, 2001, and 2005.

References

External links
 
 
 

1980 births
Living people
German women's ice hockey players
Ice hockey players at the 2002 Winter Olympics
Ilves Naiset players
Olympic ice hockey players of Germany
Sportspeople from Munich
21st-century German women